Jack Edwards Reserve is an Australian soccer ground in Oakleigh, a suburb of Melbourne, Victoria. It is the home of Oakleigh Cannons. The ground has a single main stand with seating of approx 500. The ground has a capacity of 4,000.

The ground is situated at 22 Edward Street, Oakleigh and is the venue for Senior Men's, Women's and Juniors matches of the National Premier Leagues.

References

External links
Oakleigh Cannons FC

Soccer venues in Melbourne
Sports venues in Melbourne
Oakleigh Cannons FC
Sport in the City of Monash
Buildings and structures in the City of Monash